Karate competitions at the 2022 South American Games in Asuncion, Paraguay were held between October 3 and 5, 2022 at the Pavilion 3 of SND

Schedule
The competition schedule is as follows:

Medal summary

Medal table

Medalists

Men

Women

Participation
Thirteen nations participated in karate events of the 2022 South American Games.

References

Karate
South American Games
2022
2022 South American Games